Dissochaeta is a genus of plants in the family Melastomataceae.  Species can be found in: Hainan and Indo-China through to Malesia.

Species 
Plants of the World Online lists:

 Dissochaeta acmura Stapf & M.L.Green
 Dissochaeta alstonii Nayar
 Dissochaeta angiensis Kaneh. & Hatus. ex Ohwi
 Dissochaeta annulata Hook.f. ex Triana
 Dissochaeta atrobrunnea G.Kadereit
 Dissochaeta axillaris Cogn.
 Dissochaeta bakhuizenii Veldkamp
 Dissochaeta barbata (Triana ex C.B.Clarke) Karton. (synonym Diplectria barbata (Triana ex C.B.Clarke) Franken & M.C.Roos)
 Dissochaeta beccariana Cogn.
 Dissochaeta biligulata Korth.
 Dissochaeta bracteata (Jack) Blume
 Dissochaeta brassii (M.P.Nayar) Karton.
 Dissochaeta celebica Blume
 Dissochaeta conica (Bakh.f.) Clausing
 Dissochaeta cummingii Naudin
 Dissochaeta densiflora Ridl.
 Dissochaeta divaricata (Willd.) G.Don
 Dissochaeta fallax (Jack) Blume
 Dissochaeta floccosa (J.F.Maxwell) Karton.
 Dissochaeta glabra Merr.
 Dissochaeta glandiformis J.F.Maxwell
 Dissochaeta glandulosa Merr.
 Dissochaeta gracilis Blume
 Dissochaeta griffithii (M.P.Nayar) Karton.
 Dissochaeta hirsutoidea Furtado
 Dissochaeta horrida (Bakh.f.) Karton.
 Dissochaeta inappendiculata Blume
 Dissochaeta intermedia Blume
 Dissochaeta johorensis Furtado
 Dissochaeta laevis Ohwi ex J.F.Maxwell
 Dissochaeta latifolia (Triana) Karton.
 Dissochaeta leprosa (Blume) Blume
 Dissochaeta macrosepala 
 Dissochaeta malayana Furtado
 Dissochaeta marumioides Cogn.
 Dissochaeta maxwellii (Karton.) Karton.
 Dissochaeta micrantha (Veldkamp) Karton.
 Dissochaeta nodosa Korth.
 Dissochaeta pachygyna (Korth.) I.M.Turner
 Dissochaeta pallida (Jack) Blume
 Dissochaeta papuana (Mansf.) Karton. (synonym Diplectria papuana (Mansf.) Bakh.f.)
 Dissochaeta porphyrocarpa Ridl.
 Dissochaeta pubescens (Merr.) Karton.
 Dissochaeta pulchra (Korth.) J.F.Maxwell
 Dissochaeta punctulata Hook.f. ex Triana
 Dissochaeta rectandra Karton.
 Dissochaeta rostrata Korth.
 Dissochaeta rubiginosa Stapf
 Dissochaeta sagittata Blume
 Dissochaeta sarawakensis (Nayar) J.F.Maxwell
 Dissochaeta schumannii Cogn.
 Dissochaeta spectabilis J.F.Maxwell
 Dissochaeta stipularis (Blume) Backer ex Clausing
 Dissochaeta vacillans (Blume) Blume
 Dissochaeta viminalis (Jack) Clausing

References

External links
 

Flora of Indo-China
Melastomataceae genera
Melastomataceae